Crackanory is a storytelling television series aimed at adults and inspired by the popular children's series Jackanory. It is broadcast on the UKTV channel Dave. Each episode features tales narrated by contemporary comedians and actors, containing a mix of live-action, original music and animation, all read from the same oversized chair, in a set consistent and reflective of the story.  The first series attracted widespread critical acclaim and over half a million viewers to Dave.
There are a number of reoccurring themes through the series, with the fictional company Tripec Plastics, the town of Specsham, and "fat Nicola from accounts" being frequently referenced.

First series

Episode 1
 Jack Dee "Bitter Tweet" 
 Sally Phillips "What Peebee Did Next"

Episode 2
 Rebecca Front "Fakespeare" 
 Kevin Eldon "What Do You Say?"

Episode 3
 Harry Enfield "The Teacup Has Landed" 
 Sarah Solemani "Pleasure Drone"  and

Episode 4
 Sharon Horgan "The Translator" 
 Charlie Higson "The Road to Hell"

Episode 5
 Richard Hammond "Becoming Zoe"  and 
 Jessica Hynes "My Former Self"

Episode 6
 Hugh Dennis "Head In the Clouds" 
 Stephen Mangan "The Newsreader"  and 

Live action actors in the series included Alex Macqueen, Cariad Lloyd, Katherine Jakeways, James Bachman, Martha Howe-Douglas, Nick Mohammed, Vera Filatova, Cassie and Connie Powney

Second series 
A second series was broadcast in 2014 and featured comedian Rik Mayall, who had recorded a story prior to his death. (He had performed George's Marvelous Medicine by Roald Dahl on the original Jackanory.) Channel boss Steve North called it a "complete privilege" to work with Mayall.

Episode 1
 Vic Reeves "In Space No-one Can Hear You Clean" 
 Rik Mayall "The Weatherman"

Episode 2
 Ben Miller "Man's Best Friend" 
 Sue Perkins  "Return to Sender"

Episode 3
 David Mitchell "The Surprise" 
 Katherine Parkinson "The Crisis Plan"

Episode 4
 Johnny Vegas "Self Storage" 
 Meera Syal "The Obituary Writer"

Episode 5
 Warwick Davis "The Untangler" 
 Emilia Fox "Murder He Wrote"

Episode 6
 Simon Callow "Let Me Be the Judge" 
 Ruby Wax "I'm Still Here" 

Live action actors in the second series included Simon Farnaby, Martha Howe-Douglas, Rosie Cavaliero, Michael Fish, Alice Lowe, Elis James, Victoria Wicks, Lucy Montgomery, Dominic Coleman, Tom Meeten and Sara Pascoe.

Third series 
The third series, commissioned by UKTV, was broadcast in December 2015 and was sponsored by the Amazon-owned digital audio service Audible.  The guest story readers for the six-part series included Christopher Lloyd, known for his roles in long-running sitcom Taxi and as Doc Brown in the Back to the Future trilogy.

Episode 1
 Paul Whitehouse "Uncivil War" 
 Carrie Fisher "Dread and Breakfast"

Episode 2
 Catherine Tate "The Catchment Area" 
 Richard Ayoade "The Frogbeast of Pontfidd"

Episode 3
 Jimmy Carr "The Zombie That Roared" 
 Christopher Lloyd "Di Sat Nav"

Episode 4
 Robbie Coltrane "The Last Laugh" 
 Sarah Millican "Abbatnoir"

Episode 5
 Morgana Robinson "The Truth About Suz" 
 Greg Davies "The Vexed Message"

Episode 6
 Simon Bird "Unlucky for Sam" 
 Tamsin Greig "Bob's House"  

Live action actors in the third series included Janine Duvitski, Amy Hoggart, Ray Panthaki, Kerry Howard, Alice Lowe, Martha Howe-Douglas, Marcia Warren, Kerry Godliman and Steve Oram.

Fourth series 
The fourth series, also commissioned by UKTV, was broadcast in January and February 2017. Each eight half-hour episode was contained one, not two stories, unlike in previous series. UKTV commissioning executive Tanya Qureshi stated that, "We are thrilled to be bringing back the award-winning Crackanory for a fourth time on Dave. It has become one of our landmark brands and the ambitions of the show continue to grow with each new series. We’re hugely excited to see the storytelling format evolve into a single narrative per episode, and to reveal the talented narrators who will be taking a seat in the iconic Crackanory chair."

Episode 1
 Dara Ó Briain "A Close Slave" by Tony Way

Episode 2
 Sheridan Smith "Living with a Lie" by Nico Tatarowicz

Episode 3
 Bob Mortimer "The Despot of Tea" by Arnold Widdowson

Episode 4
 Anna Friel "The Survivor" by Alexander Kirk

Episode 5
 Mel Giedroyc "Proxy Lady" by Katherine Jakeways

Episode 6
 Doc Brown, "Devil's Haircut" by Sarah Morgan

Episode 7
 Mackenzie Crook, "The Disappearance" by Toby Davies

Episode 8
 Miriam Margolyes, "Pickled" by Kevin Eldon
Live action actors in the fourth series include Moya Brady, Tom Bennett, Neil Bell, Matthew Steer, Sophia Di Martino and David Gant

References

External links 
 
 Crackanory at The British Comedy Guide Series and Episodes
 Harry Enfield returns with a twisted spin on Jackanory storytelling classic
 Website 

2013 British television series debuts
2017 British television series endings
2010s British comedy television series
British television series with live action and animation
Dave (TV channel) original programming
English-language television shows
Television series by Banijay
Television series by Tiger Aspect Productions